Mehreen Raheel (Urdu/) is a Pakistani model, actor, managing director of her family company R vision and host who appears in Pakistani films and serials.

She is best known for portraying the main leads in Meri Zaat Zarra-e-Benishan, Dastaan, Mastana Mahi, Ashk and Zindagi Gulzar Hai. She made her film debut in 2011 Jawad Ahmad's Virsa. In 2013, she appeared in Tamanna directed by a British director Steven Dean Moore.

Early life
Raheel is the daughter of actress and social activist Seemi Raheel. Her brother Daniyal Raheel is a model-turned-actor as well. She studied at Lahore Grammar School and Lahore College of Arts and Sciences then she went to London for a diploma in Dancing, Drama, and Script writing.

Career

Modeling
Raheel started her career as a Model when she was 8 years old. She has appeared in commercials for ICI, Head and Shoulders, Pantene, Lipton, Telenor, Ufone, PTCL, and Sooper Biscuit.

Film and television
Raheel started her acting career with Ajnabee Rastay in which she portrayed a minor character. She then appeared in Gardish, 3 Bata 3, Kothi No. 156, Meri Zaat Zarra-e-Benishan, Dastaan, Mujhey Hai Hukum-e-Azan, Kabhi Aye Naa Judai, Mastana Mahi, Ashk and Adha Din Aur Puri Raat. She was also nominated for Best Actress at the Lux Style Awards for her role in Kabhi Aye Na Judaai.

From 2013 onwards Raheel played the role of Madiha in telenovela Ashk and in another blockbuster serial Zindagi Gulzar Hai, she played Asmaara, which aired on Hum TV.

Raheel made her film debut in Jawad Ahmad's Virsa opposite Indian actor Arya Babbar. Her second film Tamanna directed by a British director Steven Dean Moore opposite Salman Shahid.

She is currently seen in Hum TV serial Halki Si Khalish.

Humanitarian work
Raheel travelled to India as an Ambassador for the Standard Chartered Fundraising Marathon. She has worked in Thailand with young children and in raising money to fund education. She takes part in humanitarian activities in Pakistan.

Filmography

Awards

References

External links
 

Living people
Pakistani female models
Pakistani film actresses
Pakistani television actresses
People from Lahore
Punjabi people
Lahore Grammar School alumni
21st-century Pakistani actresses
Year of birth missing (living people)